The 2019 Merlion Cup is an international men's under-23 football competition organised by the Football Association of Singapore (FAS).

Participants 
The following are the participants in this year's tournament:
  (Host)

Venue

Squads 

A final squad of 23 players (three of whom must be goalkeepers) must be registered one day before the first match of the tournament.

Fixtures

Bracket 
The draw for the tournament was held on 16 May 2019.

Semi-finals

Third place match

Final

Final standing

Statistics

Awards

Goalscorers

References 

Merlion Cup